MPV or mpv may refer to:

Vehicles

Road
 Multi-purpose vehicle, a car class ("minivan" in North America)
 Compact MPV, a medium-sized MPV
 Mini MPV, a small MPV
Mazda MPV, a minivan model

Maritime
 Multi-purpose vessel, a ship built to carry a range of cargoes

Military
 Mine Protected Vehicle (disambiguation)
 Mahindra Mine Protected Vehicle, an Indian armored personnel carrier
 Okapi MPV, a South African mine-protected vehicle

Rail
 Windhoff MPV, a multi-unit train for infrastructure maintenance
 British Rail MPV, a Windoff MPV version used in the United Kingdom

Computer software
 mpv (media player), a command-line, audio/video playback program
 Multi-Purpose Viewer, an image generator for serious simulation

Science and medicine
 Mean platelet volume, in blood testing, a measure of platelet size
 Meerwein–Ponndorf–Verley reduction, a chemical reaction reducing ketones and aldehydes
 Monkeypox virus, a pathogen of humans and other euarchontoglires

Other uses
 Mungkip language, of Papua New Guinea (ISO 639 code: mpv)
 Muslims for Progressive Values, a faith-based human rights organization